was a sumo wrestler from Nagoya, Aichi, Japan. He made his professional debut in November 1958 and reached the top division in March 1963. His highest rank was maegashira 1. Upon retirement from active competition he became an elder in the Japan Sumo Association under the name Kiyomigata. He left the Sumo Association in October 1976.

Career record

See also
Glossary of sumo terms
List of past sumo wrestlers
List of sumo tournament second division champions

References

1943 births
Japanese sumo wrestlers
Sumo people from Aichi Prefecture
Sportspeople from Nagoya
2001 deaths